The Daini Hanna Road is a toll road in Osaka and Nara prefectures. It serves as an alternate route to Japan National Route 308 under rather than over the Kuragari Pass. The road is managed by the West Nippon Expressway Company and is numbered E92 under the Ministry of Land, Infrastructure, Transport and Tourism's "2016 Proposal for Realization of Expressway Numbering."

Route description

The Daini Hanna Road begins in Higashiōsaka at the eastern terminus of the Higashi-Osaka Route of the Hanshin Expressway just west of the Keihanna Line's Shin-Ishikiri Station. Here the road is connected to Routes 170 and 308. The toll road then enters the Hanna Tunnel which makes up nearly half of the route. Halfway through the tunnel the road leaves Osaka Prefecture and enters Nara Prefecture. Emerging at the eastern end of the tunnel the toll road has a junction in Ikoma with Route 168 that is divided by a toll booth. Shortly after, the road passes through Muronoki Tunnel and into the city of Nara. The road has another junction and passes through another tunnel before coming to its eastern terminus at Route 308 (Hanna Road).

For the entire length of the toll road the speed limit is set at 60 km/h. The road features 2 lanes of traffic travelling in each direction.

History
After opening, the Daini Hanna Road was managed by the Osaka and Nara Prefecture Road Corporations, but on 1 April 2019 the management of the road was transferred to the West Nippon Expressway Company.

Junction list
TB= Toll booth

|colspan="8" style="text-align: center;"|Through to  Hanshin Expressway Higashi-Osaka Route

References

See also

Japan National Route 308
West Nippon Expressway Company

Roads in Osaka Prefecture
Roads in Nara Prefecture
Toll roads in Japan